Linda Chaney is an American politician serving as a member of the Florida House of Representatives from the 69th district. She assumed office on November 3, 2020.

Early life and education 
Chaney was born in New York and moved to Florida in 1982. She earned a Bachelor of Science degree in mass communication from the University of South Florida.

Career 
Prior to entering politics, Chaney worked in marketing and business development. She co-founded an independent mammography business that was eventually acquired by AdventHealth. She served as a member of the St. Pete Beach City Commission from 2007 to 2009. Chaney was elected to the Florida House of Representatives in November 2020.

Committee assignments 

 Rules Committee   Vice Chair
 Infrastructure & Tourism Appropriations Subcommittee   Vice Chair
 Appropriations Committee
 Infrastructure Strategies Committee
 Agriculture, Conservation & Resiliency Subcommittee
 Healthcare Regulation Subcommittee

References 

Living people
People from New York (state)
People from Pinellas County, Florida
University of South Florida alumni
Republican Party members of the Florida House of Representatives
Women state legislators in Florida
Year of birth missing (living people)
21st-century American women